Robert John Nowaskey (February 3, 1918 – March 21, 1971) was an American football end, born in Everett, Pennsylvania, who played eight seasons in the All-America Football Conference (AAFC) and in the National Football League (NFL).

Personal life
Nowaskey was of Polish descent.

References

External links

 

1918 births
1971 deaths
American football ends
American people of Polish descent
Baltimore Colts (1947–1950) players
Chicago Bears players
George Washington Colonials football players
Los Angeles Dons players
People from Everett, Pennsylvania
Players of American football from Pennsylvania